Wish Tree is an ongoing art installation series by Japanese artist Yoko Ono, started in 1996, in which a tree native to a site is planted under her direction. Viewers are usually invited to tie a written wish to the tree except during the winter months when a tree can be more vulnerable. Locations of the piece have included New York City, St. Louis, Wish Tree for Washington, DC, San Francisco, Pasadena, and Palo Alto, California, Tokyo, Venice, Paris, Dublin, London, Exeter, England, Finland and Buenos Aires, Argentina, Calgary.

Her 1996 Wish Piece had the following instructions:

Installations have involved from one to 21 trees, and varieties include lemon trees, eucalyptus, and crepe myrtles. To honor wish writers' privacy, Ono claims she does not read the wishes, and collects them all to be buried at the base of the Imagine Peace Tower on Viðey Island in Kollafjörður Bay in Iceland. To date over 1 million wishes have been buried beneath the tower.

History
The series developed after an installation of one tree in Finland grew into a mini-forest, and Ono felt a continuing social need. She has also said:

In fall 2010, Ono performed Voice Piece for Soprano, near the MoMA rendition of the piece as part of the museum's collections show. Musician Pharrell Williams wrote on one in New York in 2013.

Locations

References

Installation art works
Works by Yoko Ono
2002 works
2003 works
2008 works
2009 works
2010 works
2012 works
2013 works
2019 works